Instituto San Lorenzo is a high school located in  Rancagua, Provincia de Cachapoal, Chile.

It was established in 1995.

References 

Educational institutions established in 1995
Secondary schools in Chile
Schools in Cachapoal Province
1995 establishments in Chile